is a passenger railway station in located in the city of Tsu,  Mie Prefecture, Japan, operated by the private railway operator Kintetsu Railway.

Lines
Chisato Station is served by the Nagoya Line, and is located 57.9 rail kilometers from the starting point of the line at Kintetsu Nagoya Station.

Station layout
The station was consists of two opposed side platforms, connected by a level crossing. The station is unattended.

Platforms

Adjacent stations

History
Chisato Station opened on January 1, 1917 as a station on the Ise Railway. It was closed in October 1927. The station reopened on July 1, 1943 as a station on Kansai Express Railway's Nagoya Line. This line was merged with the Nankai Electric Railway on June 1, 1944 to form Kintetsu.

Passenger statistics
In fiscal 2019, the station was used by an average of 1638 passengers daily (boarding passengers only).

Surrounding area
Marina Kawage
Suzuka International University, Suzuka Junior College

See also
List of railway stations in Japan

References

External links

 Kintetsu: Chisato Station

Railway stations in Japan opened in 1917
Railway stations in Mie Prefecture
Stations of Kintetsu Railway
Tsu, Mie